Surströmming is lightly salted fermented Baltic Sea herring traditional to Swedish cuisine since at least the 16th century. Surströmming or fermented herring is distinct from fried or pickled herring.

Traditionally,  is defined as herring caught in the brackish waters of the Baltic north of the Kalmar Strait. The herring used for surströmming are caught just prior to spawning in April and May.

During the production of surströmming, just enough salt is used to prevent the raw herring from rotting while allowing it to ferment. A fermentation process of at least six months gives the fish a characteristic strong smell and somewhat acidic taste. A newly opened can of surströmming has one of the most putrid food smells in the world, even stronger than similarly fermented fish dishes such as the Korean hongeohoe or Japanese kusaya.

At the end of the 1940s, surströmming producers in Sweden lobbied for a royal ordinance that would prevent incompletely fermented fish from being sold. The decree that was issued forbade sales of the current year's production in Sweden prior to the third Thursday in August. While the ordinance is no longer on the books, retailers still maintain the date for the "premiere" of that year's catch.

Origin 
Surströmming has been part of northern Swedish cuisine since at least the 16th century.

Fermented fish is an old staple in European cuisines. The oldest archeological findings of fish fermentation are 9,200 years old and from the south of today's Sweden. More recent examples include garum, a fermented fish sauce made by the ancient Greeks and Romans, and Worcestershire sauce, which also has a fermented fish ingredient.

Preservation of fish through fermentation in a weak brine may have developed when brining was still expensive due to the cost of salt. In modern times, the fish are initially marinated in a strong brine solution that draws out the blood, and then fermented in a weaker brine in barrels prior to canning.

The canning procedure, introduced in the 19th century, enabled the product to be marketed in shops and stored at home, whereas at one time the final stage would have been storage in large wooden barrels and smaller, one-litre kegs. Canning also enabled the product to be marketed farther south in Sweden.

Chemical process 
The fermentation happens through autolysis and starts from a lactic acid enzyme in the spine of the fish. Together with bacteria, pungent smelling acids are formed, such as propionic acid, butyric acid and acetic acid. Hydrogen sulfide is also produced. The salt raises the osmotic pressure of the brine above the zone where bacteria responsible for rotting can thrive and prevents decomposition of proteins into oligopeptides and amino acids. Instead, the osmotic conditions enable Halanaerobium bacteria such as H. praevalens to thrive and decompose the fish glycogen into organic acids, making it sour (acidic).

Production and market 

The herring are caught in April and May, when they are in prime condition and just about to spawn, and have not yet fattened. They are put into a strong brine for about 20 hours that draws out the blood, after which the heads are removed and the fish is gutted and put into a weaker brine solution. Canning takes place at the beginning of July and for five weeks thereafter. Ten days prior to the premiere the final product is distributed to wholesalers.
The fermentation of the fish depends on a lactic acid enzyme in the spine that is activated if the conditions are right (temperature and brine concentration). The low temperature in Northern Sweden is one of the parameters that affects the character of the final product.

Prior to modern canning methods, surströmming was sold in wooden barrels for immediate consumption, as even the smaller one-litre kegs could leak.

Fermentation continues in the can, causing it to bulge noticeably, which would usually be a sign of botulism or other food poisoning concern in non-fermented canned foods. Species of Halanaerobium bacteria are responsible for the in-can ripening. These bacteria produce carbon dioxide and a number of compounds that account for the unique odor: pungent (propionic acid), rotten-egg (hydrogen sulfide), rancid-butter (butyric acid), and vinegary (acetic acid). Due to these gases, a thousand cans of surströmming exploded over a period of six hours during a fire at a Swedish warehouse in 2014.

Surströmming is commonly sold in grocery stores all over Sweden. According to the Surströmming Academy's statistics from 2009, there are about 2 million people who eat surströmming annually. Sweden's export of surströmming is only 0,2 percent of all produced surströmming.

However some people do not care for surströmming. It is a food that is subject to strong passions, as is lutefisk.

Preparation 

Swedes usually consume surströmming after the third Thursday of August, labeled as "Surströmming day", through early September. Because of the strong smell, it is often eaten outdoors. The pressurized can is usually opened some distance away from the dining table and is often initially punctured while immersed in a bucket of water, or after tapping and angling it upwards at 45 degrees, to prevent escaping gas from spraying brine.

Surströmming comes both ungutted with just the heads removed and as fillets. Regarding the first version, the fish is gutted prior to eating, and the backbone and sometimes the skin are removed. The roe is commonly eaten along with the fish.

Surströmming is often eaten with tunnbröd, a thin, either soft or crispy bread (not to be confused with crispbread). The use of tunnbröd originated in the High Coast area, where the tradition is to make a sandwich (known as a surströmmingsklämma) using two pieces of buttered hard tunnbröd. In addition to the fish, the two most common toppings are potatoes (either sliced or mashed, often almond potatoes) and finely diced red onion. Surströmming is also commonly eaten without bread together with the accompanying ingredients. To balance the strong flavour of the fish, Västerbotten cheese is sometimes added.

In the southern part of Sweden, it is customary to use a variety of condiments such as diced red onion, gräddfil (fat fermented sour cream similar to smetana) or crème fraîche, chives, and sometimes even tomato and chopped dill.

Surströmming is commonly served with snaps, light beers like pilsner or lager, svagdricka (a type of small beer), water, or cold milk. What to drink with surströmming is disputed among connoisseurs. Surströmming is usually served as the focus of a traditional festivity called a surströmmingsskiva.

International opinion 

German food critic and author Wolfgang Fassbender wrote that "the biggest challenge when eating surströmming is to vomit only after the first bite, as opposed to before".

European Union 
Due to being made from herring from the Baltic Sea, surströmming today contains higher levels of dioxins and PCBs than permitted in the EU. Sweden was granted exceptions to these rules from 2002 to 2011, and a renewal of the exceptions was then applied for.

Surströmming challenge 
Since gaining notoriety as one of the world's smelliest foods, surströmming has become the focus of a number of "challenge" videos on YouTube and other platforms where people uninitiated to the food show themselves opening a can for the first time, usually to visceral reaction, and then try to eat the fish without additional preparation. Often the videos show the participants gagging, swearing, holding their nose, or vomiting. The videos have been criticized for not following the normal preparation methods, which include opening the can outdoors and/or underwater, gutting the fish and removing the backbone, and serving with tunnbröd and other accoutrements to make a surströmmingsklämma.

German eviction 
In 1981, a German landlord evicted a tenant without notice after the tenant spread surströmming brine in the apartment building's stairwell. When the landlord was taken to court, the court ruled that the termination was justified when the landlord's party demonstrated their case by opening a can inside the courtroom. The court concluded that it "had convinced itself that the disgusting smell of the fish brine far exceeded the degree that fellow-tenants in the building could be expected to tolerate".

Airline bans 
In April 2006, several major airlines (such as Air France, British Airways, Finnair, and KLM) banned the fish, claiming that the pressurised cans of fish are potentially explosive. The sale of the fish was subsequently discontinued in Stockholm's international airport. Those who produce the fish have called the airlines' decision "culturally illiterate", claiming that it is a "myth that the tinned fish can explode".

Protests in Hong Kong 
During March 2018 Hong Kong by-elections, the returning officer Amy Chan Yuen-man had disqualified two localist candidates Ventus Lau and James Chan Kwok-keung. Lau visited the Home Affairs Department of Sha Tin District Office in person asking for a meeting with Chan. Lau had brought a can of surströmming and opened it in public. Lau said that he would like Chan to sense that the Hong Kong people are facing an entirely rotten election system. Lau launched an appeal to the Court, which ruled that Chan's decisions were not justified.

Museum 
The name of the museum is "Fiskevistet" (translated as 'The Fish Encampment').

See also 
 List of delicacies
 Spekesild - herring pickled in salt

Other fermented fish dishes
 Cantonese salted fish
 Colatura di alici – typical sauce of Amalfi connected with garum
 Fesikh – Egyptian fermented fish
 Hákarl – Icelandic fermented shark
 Kusaya – Japanese fermented then dried fish
 Pla ra – Fermented fish and rice flour seasoning common throughout Southeast Asia
 Prahok – Fermented fish paste (usually mudfish) unique to Cambodia.
 Rakfisk – Norwegian fermented freshwater fish
 Shiokara – Japanese seafood fermented in highly salted viscera

Other strong-smelling foods
 
 
 Durian – very pungent-smelling fruit from southeast Asia
 
 Kiviak – fermented birds in seal skin from Greenland
 Shrimp paste – prawn sauce or trasi, a fermented condiment used in Asian and Chinese cuisines
 
 Tyrolean grey cheese – a strongly flavoured cheese made in the Tyrolean Alp valleys of Austria

Notes

References 
 Ringblom, Fredrik and Westerlund, Örjan (2009) Surströmming: En handbok. Grenadine. . (Swedish)

External links 

 Surströmming.se  

Fermented fish
Canned meat
Swedish cuisine
Norrland
Fish processing
National dishes
Herring dishes